Uproar in the Studio is a black and white Chinese animation short made in 1926 by Wan Laiming and Wan Guchan. The short film helped the Wan brothers become recognized as the pioneers of the animation industry in China. The film is now lost.

Style
The film was combined with live footage. It is about an artist working in his studio. Suddenly he is disturbed by a small paper person jumping out of the page causing an uproar. The artist in the footage was Wan Guchan.

History
Uproar in the Studio was created for non-commercial use by the Wan brothers when they were working at the Great Wall Film Company.  The animation ran for 10–12 minutes in black and white to showcase the technology.

Confusion
In 1985, Marie-Claire Quiquemelle's essay "The Wan Brothers and 60 years of Animated Film in China" in Festival d'Annecy stated that there are really two separate films produced in 1926. Uproar in the Studio is modeled after the U.S film Out of the Inkwell by Max Fleischer. Another film, Paperman Makes Trouble, is known as 纸人捣乱记 or 一封书信寄回来 in the original Chinese. The story has to do with the paper person receiving a letter. Because the contents are so similar, there is a lot of confusion concerning the two.

It is believed the younger Wan brother's studio was bombed as part of the January 28 incident.

See also
 History of Chinese Animation
 Chinese Animation

External links
 China Movie DB

1926 films
Chinese animated films
Chinese silent films
Lost animated films
1926 animated films
Chinese animated short films
Lost Chinese films
1926 lost films
Chinese black-and-white films